was a Japanese professional sumo wrestler. He was the sport's 25th yokozuna.

Career 
He entered sumo in January 1900, using the shikona name . He changed his shikona for the last time in January 1914, when he took the given name Kajirō.

Nishinoumi was awarded a yokozuna licence by the house of Yoshida Tsukasa in February 1916 after winning a championship at the January 1916 tournament. He was 36 years old at the time of his promotion, making him the oldest wrestler to be promoted to yokozuna in the 20th century. In the top makuuchi division, he won 106 bouts and lost 38 bouts, recording a winning percentage of 73.6. He was the only wrestler to defeat Tachiyama between 1909 and 1916, his victory in January 1912 preventing Tachiyama from recording 100 straight wins (he had a winning streak of 43 before, and 56 after their bout). Tachiyama claimed many years later that Nishinoumi's win over him had been yaocho (fixed), but there is little evidence for this.

He favoured the yokozuna dohyō-iri (yokozuna ring-entering ceremony) style that has come to be known as Unryū .

After his retirement, he was an elder known as Izutsu and produced many top division wrestlers, such as yokozuna Nishinoumi Kajirō III. During his tenure Izutsu's influence in the Japan Sumo Association increased, but he was accused of using his position unfairly by his opponents after he added a director to the Sumo Association's board from his own ichimon or stable group. He eventually committed suicide by hanging on January 27, 1931.

His adopted daughter's grandsons are Sakahoko Akihiro and Terao Tsunefumi.

Top division record

References

See also 

 Glossary of sumo terms
 List of past sumo wrestlers
List of sumo tournament top division champions
 List of yokozuna

1880 births
1931 suicides
Japanese sumo wrestlers
Yokozuna
Sumo people from Kagoshima Prefecture
Suicides by hanging in Japan
1931 deaths